Reim is a surname which may refer to:

 Martin Reim (born 1971), Estonian football manager and former player
 Matthias Reim (born 1957), German singer

See also
 Re'im, a kibbutz in Israel
 Reem (disambiguation)
 Riem (name), a list of people with the surname or given name

Surnames from given names
Estonian-language surnames
German-language surnames